An amyl alcohol is any of eight alcohols with the formula C5H12O. A mixture of amyl alcohols (also called amyl alcohol) can be obtained from fusel alcohol. Amyl alcohol is used as a solvent and in esterification, by which is produced amyl acetate and other important products. The name amyl alcohol without further specification applies to the normal (straight-chain) form, 1-pentanol.

These are the 8 alcohols that are structural isomers with molecular formula C5H12O:

{| class="wikitable sortable"
|+Amyl alcohol isomers
|-
! Common name !! Structure !! Type !! IUPAC name !! Boiling point (°C)
|-
| 1-pentanolor normal amyl alcohol
| 
| primary
| Pentan-1-ol
| 138.5
|-
| 2-methyl-1-butanolor active amyl alcohol
| 
| primary
| 2-Methylbutan-1-ol
| 128.7
|-
| 3-methyl-1-butanolor isoamyl alcoholor isopentyl alcohol
| 
| primary
| 3-Methylbutan-1-ol
| 131.2
|-
| 2,2-dimethyl-1-propanolor neopentyl alcohol
| 
| primary
| 2,2-Dimethylpropan-1-ol
| 113.1
|-
| 2-pentanolor sec-amyl alcoholor methyl (n) propyl carbinol
| 
| secondary
| Pentan-2-ol
| 118.8
|-
| 3-methyl-2-butanolor sec-isoamyl alcoholor methyl isopropyl carbinol
| 
| secondary
| 3-Methylbutan-2-ol
| 113.6
|-
| 3-Pentanol
| 
| secondary
| Pentan-3-ol
| 115.3
|-
| 2-methyl-2-butanolor tert-amyl alcohol
| 
| tertiary
| 2-Methylbutan-2-ol
| 102
|}

Three of these alcohols, 2-methyl-1-butanol, 2-pentanol, and 3-methyl-2-butanol (methyl isopropyl carbinol), are therefore optically active.

The most important amyl alcohol is isoamyl alcohol, the chief one generated by fermentation in the production of alcoholic beverages and a constituent of fusel oil. The other amyl alcohols may be obtained synthetically.

References

Alkanols
GABAA receptor positive allosteric modulators